Luis Fuentes may refer to:

Luis Fuentes (wrestler) (born 1946), Guatemalan wrestler
Luis Fuentes (politician) (born 1960), Spanish politician
Luis Fuentes (footballer, born 1971), Chilean footballer
Luis Fuentes (footballer, born 1986), Mexican football left-back
Luis Fuentes (footballer, born 1995), Chilean football midfielder

See also
Luis Fuente (born 1991), Mexican boxer
Luisa Fuentes (born 1948), Peruvian volleyball player